Articles (arranged alphabetically) related to Guinea-Bissau include:



A

Abdul Injai (Abdoul Ndaiye) -
Abdul Rahman al-Sadi -
Administrador -
Africa Squadron -
Leo Africanus -
Agriculture in Guinea-Bissau -
Aldeamento -
Alfa -
Alfa Mahmoud Kati -
Alfa Molo -
Alfa Yaya -
Amarildo Almeida -
Jose Eduardo Araujo -
Fernando Arlete (sprinter) - Olympic sprinter
Fernando Arlete (distance runner) - Olympic distance runner
Armazens do Povo (People's Stores) -
Armee de Liberation Nacionale Guineene (ALNG) -
Art of Guinea-Bissau -
Askia Mohammad -
Assembleia Nacional Popular (ANP) -
Assimilados -
Diego da Azambuja -
Gomes Eannes de Azurara

B

Badius -
Bafatá -
Bagas -
Baiotes -
Balafon -
Balantas -
Balantes -
Baldé -
Adul Baldé -
Ibraima Baldé -
Mamadi Baldé -
Bambaras -
Bana -
Banco National Ultramarino (BNU) -
Banyuns; Banhuns; Bainuk -
Rafael Paula Barbosa -
Rui Duarte de Barros -
Honorio Pereira Berreto -
Ibn Battuta -
Batuko; Batuco; Batuque -
Beafadas; Biafadas -
Phillip Beaver -
Berlin Congress -
Antonio de Barros Bezerra -
Bijagos; Bidyogos; Bijegas; Bissagos; Bojagos; Bujagos -
Judice Joaquim Biker -
Bissau -
Bissau-Guineans -
José Câmnate na Bissign -
Black Ladino -
Bolama Island -
Bolama Region -
Bolama (town) -
Bolanhas - 
Balana - 
Bulana -
Bolola -
Brames -
Buba -
Benjamin Pinto Bull -
Jaime Pinto Bull -

C

Alfredo Lopes Cabral -
Amílcar Cabral -
Juvenal Cabral -
Luis de Almeida Cabral -
Maria da Conceição Nobre Cabral -
Pedro Álvares Cabral -
Vasco Cabral -
Cacheu -
Alvise Cadamosto -
Caderneta -
Marcello Caetano -
Canary Current -
Canchungo -
Diogo Cão -
Capitacao -
Caravel -
Adilson Soares Cassamá -
Cipriano Cassamá -
Carlos Correia -
Casa dos Estudantes do Imperio (CEI) -
Casablanca Group -
Casamance -
Casangas -
Centro do Instrucao Politico Militar (CIPM) -
Cinema of Guinea-Bissau -
Class in Guinea-Bissau -
Cobianas -
Cocolis; Kokolis -
Coli Tenguela -
Christopher Columbus -
Comissao Permanente -
Companhia do Cacheu e Cabo Verde -
Companhia Geral do Grão Pará e Maranhão -
Companhia Lusitana do Aluminio da Guine e Angola -
Companhia Uniao Fabril (CUF) -
Conferência das Organizações Nacionalistas das Colónias Portuguesas (CONCP) -
Conhaques (Conhaguis) -
Conselho de Guerra -
Comite Executivo da Luta (CEL) -
Conselho Superior da Luta (CSL) -
Contratado -
Corubal River (Rio Corubal) -
Manuel Saturnino da Costa -
Crioulo -
Currency of Guinea-Bissau -

D

Duarte Lobo da Gama -
Vasco da Gama -
Silvino da Luz -
Baciro Dabó -
Degredados -
Demographics of Guinea-Bissau -
Denianke; Denanke -
Antonio de Noli -
Dialonkes; Djalonkes; Jaloncas; Jallonkes -
Bartolomeu Dias -
Diniz Dias -
Diolas; Djolas; Jolas -
Direcao Geral de Seguaranca (DGS) -
Baciro Dja -
Kimi Djabate -
Mamadú Iaia Djaló -
Donatario -
Abilio Augusto Monteiro Duarte -
Dulce Almada Duarte -
Dyulas; Diulas; Julas -

E

Consalo Eannes -
Gil Eannes -
Economy of Guinea-Bissau -
Education in Guinea-Bissau -
Elections in Guinea-Bissau -
Talata Embalo -
Exploration of Guinea-Bissau -

F

Francisco Fadul -
Louis Faidherbe -
Farim -
Farim River; Cacheu River -
Feitor -
Feotoria -
Felupe -
Gil Vincente Vaz Fernandes -
Valentim Fernandes -
Antonio Batica Ferreira -
Fode Kaba (Alfa Molo) -
Fonio -
Forcas Armadas Revolucionarias do Povo (FARP) -
Foreign relations of Guinea-Bissau -
Forrea -
Fórum Cívico Guineense-Social Democracia (FCG/SD) -
Frente de Libertacao da Guine (FLG) -
Frente de Libertacao da Guiné Portuguesa e Cabo Verde (FLGC) -
Frente de Luta Pela Independencia Nacional da Guiné-Bissau (FLING) -
Frente Democratica (FD) -
Frente Democratica Social (FDS) -
Frente Revolucionaria Africana Para a Independencia Nacional das Colonias Portuguesas (FRAIN) -
Front Uni de Liberation (FUL) -
Fula language; Fula people; Fulbe; Fulani; Peul; Fellani; Ful; Foulah; Fellata -
Fuladu -
Funana -
Fouta Djallon; Djalonkes; Jalonke; Dialonke; Jaalo -
Futa Toro -

G

Gabú -
Henriques Galvao -
Rio de Geba; Geba River -
Aristides Gomes -
Carlos Gomes -
Diogo Gomes -
Fernando Gomes -
Fernao Gomes -
Flora Gomes -
Antão Gonçalves -
Goree -
Griot -
Grumetes; Grumettas -
Grupo de Accao Democratica de Cabo Verde e da Guine (GADCVG) -
Sofia Pomba Guerra -
Guiledge -
Guinala; Quinara -
Guinea-Bissau Civil War

H

John Hawkins -
Health in Guinea-Bissau -
Henry the Navigator -
Rogerio Araujo Adolfo Herbert -
History of Guinea-Bissau -

I

Kumba Iala -
Ilhas de Barlavento -
Ilhas de Sotavento -
Faustino Imbali -
Indigena -
Indigo -
Antonio Indjai -
Zamora Induta -
Infali Sonco -
Injai -
Islam in Guinea-Bissau -
Pansau na Isna -

J

Judaism in Guinea-Bissau -
Juventude Africana Amilcar Cabral (JAAC) -

K

Kaabu; Gabu; Kabu -
Inocencio Kani -
Martinho Ndafa Kabi -
Kansala; Cansala -
Mahmoud Kati -
Mamadu Ture Kuruma -
Kussunde -

L

Henri Labery -
Labor unions in Guinea-Bissau -
Ladinos -
Lançados -
Landumas; Landomas -
Languages of Guinea-Bissau -
Lebanese in Guinea-Bissau -
Legislative Assembly of Portugal -
LGBT rights in Guinea-Bissau (Gay rights) -
Liga Guineense -
Aristides Raimundo Lima -
List of companies based in Guinea-Bissau -
Literature of Guinea-Bissau -

M

Antonio Malfante -
Mali -
Mamadu -
Mandinka people; Mandinka language; Manding; Mandinga; Mandingo; Malinké; Mande -
Ansumane Mané -
Manjaco; Mandyako -
Victor Saude Maria -
Eneida Marta -
Graciela Martins -
Mansa Musa -
Rio Mansoa; Mansoa River -
Media in Guinea-Bissau -
Francisco Mendes -
Simoes Antonio Mendes -
Jacira Mendonca -
Mesticos -
Mindelo -
Minerals in Guinea-Bissau -
Antonio Isaac Monteiro -
António Mascarenhas Monteiro -
Maria do Ceu Monteiro -
Military of Guinea-Bissau -
Moranca -
Mouvement de Liberation des Iles du Cap Vert (MLICV) -
Mouvement de Liberation de la Guinee Portugaise et des Iles du Cap Vert (MLGCV) -
Mouvement des Forces Democratiques de la Casamance (MFDC) -
Movimento Anti-Colonialista (MAC) -
Movimento de Libertacao da Guine (MLG) -
Movimento de Libertacao da Guine Portuguesa (MLGP) -
Movimento de Unidade Para a Democracia (MUDe) -
Movimento Para Democracia (MpD) -
Movimento Para Independencia Nacional da Guine Portuguesa (MING) -
Musa Molo Balde -
Music of Guinea-Bissau -

N

Nalus; Nalous -
Adiato Djalo Nandigna -
Manuel Serifo Nhamadjo -
Alamara Nhasse -
Nova Lamego -
Caetano N'Tchama -

O

Oil Palm -
Ouri; Ayo; Mankala; Mankara; Ohwaree; Omweso; Wari -

P

Padrão -
Pajadincas -
Palmatoria -
Pano -
Mungo Park -
Partido Africano da Independencia da Guine e Cabo Verde (PAIGC) -
Partido da Convergência Democrática (PCD) -
Partido da Renovação Social (PRS) -
Partido Democrático do Progresso (PDP) -
Partido Para Renovacao e Desenvolvimento (PRD) -
Partido Unido Social Democrata (PUSD) -
Guinea-Bissauan passport -
Mamadu Pate -
Pepels; Pepeis -
Aristides Maria Pereira -
Carmen Pereira -
Peoples of Guinea-Bissau -
Duarte Pacheco Pereira -
Francisca Pereira -
Raimundo Pereira -
Permanent Secretariat/Commission -
Petrofina -
Sociedade Anonima de Refinacao de Petroleos (SOCAR) -
Pijiguiti -
Joao Teixeira Pinto -
Pionieros de Partido (PP) -
Mamadu Saliu Djalo Pires -
Mario Pires -
Pedro Verona Rodrigues Pires -
Policia Internacional Para Defesa do Estado (PIDE) -
Marquis de Pombal -
Politics of Guinea-Bissau -
Ponta -
Prehistory of Guinea-Bissau -
Helder Proenca -

Q

Adelino Mano Queita -
Adelino Mano Queta -

R

Domingos Ramos -
Rassemblement Democratique Africain de la Guinee (RDAG) -
Regime do Indigenato -
Regulo -
Religion in Guinea-Bissau -
Resistência da Guiné-Bissau-Movimento Bafatá (RGB-MB) -
Rice in Guinea-Bissau -
Henrique Rosa -

S

Antonio de Oliveira Salazar -
Saloum; Salum -
Sama Koli -
Sao Tiago -
Soares Sambu -
Artur Sanha -
Malam Bacai Sanhá -
Mohamed Lamine Sanha -
Saracotes; Saracole -
Jose Carlos Schwarz -
Veríssimo Correia Seabra -
Senegambians -
Serer -
Abdulai Sila -
Ernestina Sila -
Holder da Silva -
Pedro da Sintra -
Slave trade -

Songhai -
Soninke -
Sonko -
Antonio de Spinola -
Susus; Soussous; Sossos; Sosos -

T

Tabanca Committee -
Umar Tall -
Tandas; Tendas -
Tangomaos; Tangomaus -
Bubo Na Tchuto -

Tekrur; Tukolor -
Tenguella; Teengala; Tengella; Temala; Coli; Kooli; Koly -
Constantino Teixeira -
Timenes -
Domingas Togna -
Samori Toure -
Transportation in Guinea-Bissau -
Traore -
Tiramakhan Traore -
Nuno Tristão -

U

Uniao Caboverdeana Para a Independencia e Democracia (UCID) -
Uniao da Populacoes das Ilhas de Cabo Verde (UPICV) -
Uniao Democratica da Guine (UDG) -
Uniao Democratica das Mulheres (UDEMU) -
Uniao dos Naturais da Guine Portuguesa (UNGP) -
Uniao Geral dos Estudiantes da Africa Negra (UGEAN) -
Uniao Geral dos Trabalhadores da Guine-Bissau (UGTGB) -
Uniao Nacional dos Trabalhadores de Guine (UNTG) -
Uniao Popular Para Libertacao da Guine (UPLG) -
Union des Ressortissants de la Guinee Portugaise (URGP) -

V

Carlos Veiga -
João Bernardo Vieira -
Osvaldo Vieira International Airport -

W

Women in Guinea-Bissau -

Y
World Universities Debating Championship

Z

Ziguinchor -

Guinea-Bissau